Hypercompe theophila is a moth of the family Erebidae first described by Paul Dognin in 1902. It is found in Colombia.

References

Hypercompe
Moths described in 1902